"One Night" (originally titled "1Night") is a song by American rapper Lil Yachty. It is the lead single from Yachty's debut mixtape, Lil Boat (2016). The song was produced by TheGoodPerry.

"One Night" originally appeared in a viral video on YouTube named "When Bae Hits You With That "So What Are We?". As a result, the song has received more than 39 million plays on Yachty's SoundCloud.

The single has peaked at number 49 on the US Billboard Hot 100. The single was certified Platinum by the Recording Industry Association of America (RIAA).

Music video
The music video of "One Night" was uploaded to YouTube on Lil Yachty's channel on May 23, 2016 and has received over 130 million views as of Jan 2023.

Charts

Weekly charts

Year-end charts

Certifications

References 

2015 songs
2015 singles
Lil Yachty songs
Songs written by Lil Yachty
Viral videos